is a former Japanese football player. He played for Japan national team.

Club career
Nakamura was born in Fujieda on April 8, 1955. After graduating from Hosei University, he joined Fujitsu in 1978. In 1978 season, however he played 11 games and scored 3 goals, the club was relegated to Division 2. He retired in 1981.

National team career
On March 4, 1979, Nakamura debuted for Japan national team against South Korea. In this match, he scored a goal and Japan won the match. He played 5 games and scored 1 goal for Japan in 1979.

National team statistics

References

External links
 
 Japan National Football Team Database

1955 births
Living people
Hosei University alumni
Association football people from Shizuoka Prefecture
Japanese footballers
Japan international footballers
Japan Soccer League players
Kawasaki Frontale players
Association football forwards
People from Fujieda, Shizuoka